Mepiprazole (INN, BAN) (brand name Psigodal) is an anxiolytic drug of the phenylpiperazine group with additional antidepressant properties that is marketed in Spain. It acts as a 5-HT2A and α1-adrenergic receptor antagonist and inhibits the reuptake and induces the release of serotonin, dopamine, and norepinephrine to varying extents, and has been described as a serotonin antagonist and reuptake inhibitor (SARI). Controlled clinical trials of mepiprazole in patients with irritable bowel syndrome (IBS) were also carried out and suggested some benefits of the drug in relieving symptoms of IBS in some patients. Similarly to other phenylpiperazines like trazodone, nefazodone, and etoperidone, mepiprazole produces mCPP as an active metabolite.

See also
 Acaprazine
 Enpiprazole
 Lorpiprazole
 Tolpiprazole

References

5-HT2A antagonists
Alpha-1 blockers
meta-Chlorophenylpiperazines
Pyrazoles
Serotonin-norepinephrine-dopamine releasing agents